District 31 of the Texas Senate is a senatorial district that currently serves Andrews, Armstrong, Bailey, Briscoe, Carson, Castro, Cochran, Collingsworth, Dallam, Deaf Smith, Donley, Ector, Gaines, Glasscock, Gray, Hall, Hansford, Hartley, Hemphill, Howard, Hutchinson, Lipscomb, Loving, Martin, Midland, Moore, Ochiltree, Oldham, Parmer, Potter, Randall, Roberts, Sherman, Swisher, Wheeler, Winkler and Yoakum counties in the U.S. state of Texas.

The current Senator from District 31 is Kevin Sparks.

Top 5 biggest cities in district
District 31 has a population of 793,600 with 573,847 that is at voting age from the 2010 census.

Election history
Election history of District 31 from 1992.

Previous elections

2018

2014

2012

2008

2004

2004

2002

1998

1994

1992

District officeholders

Notes

References

31
Andrews County, Texas
Armstrong County, Texas
Bailey County, Texas
Briscoe County, Texas
Carson County, Texas
Castro County, Texas
Cochran County, Texas
Collingsworth County, Texas
Dallam County, Texas
Deaf Smith County, Texas
Donley County, Texas
Ector County, Texas
Gaines County, Texas
Glasscock County, Texas
Gray County, Texas
Hall County, Texas
Hansford County, Texas
Hartley County, Texas
Hemphill County, Texas
Howard County, Texas
Hutchinson County, Texas
Lipscomb County, Texas
Loving County, Texas
Martin County, Texas
Midland County, Texas
Moore County, Texas
Ochiltree County, Texas
Oldham County, Texas
Parmer County, Texas
Potter County, Texas
Randall County, Texas
Roberts County, Texas
Sherman County, Texas
Swisher County, Texas
Wheeler County, Texas
Winkler County, Texas
Yoakum County, Texas